Trichillurges is a genus of beetles in the family Cerambycidae, containing the following species:

 Trichillurges bordoni Monné, 1990
 Trichillurges brasiliensis (Melzer, 1935)
 Trichillurges conspersus Monné, 1990
 Trichillurges maculatus Martins & Monné, 1974
 Trichillurges meridanus Monné, 1990
 Trichillurges olivaceus Monné, 1990
 Trichillurges simplex Martins & Monné, 1974

References

Acanthocinini